The Leicester Longwool is an English breed of sheep. Alternative names for the breed include: Leicester, Bakewell Leicester, Dishley Leicester, English Leicester, Improved Leicester and New Leicester. It was originally developed by 18th-century breeding innovator Robert Bakewell.

It is now one of Britain's rarest breeds, categorised as "endangered" by the Rare Breeds Survival Trust, since fewer than 500 registered breeding females remain in the United Kingdom.

History

Leicester Longwool sheep date back to the 1700s, and were found in the Midland counties of England, originally developed in Dishley Grange, Leicestershire by Robert Bakewell. Bakewell was the foremost exponent of modern animal-breeding techniques in the selection of livestock. 
The Leicester Longwool in the 1700s was slow-growing and coarsely boned. They now have been developed to gain weight quickly and are fast-growing.
Leicester Longwool was one of the first pure sheep breeds introduced to Australia, having been introduced in 1826.
The Leicester Longwool has been used to improve many sheep breeds because of its meaty carcase (carcass) and heavy fleece.

Characteristics

The head of an Leicester Longwool should be carried well, not too high and should have no signs of horns on the poll (forehead). The face is generally in a wedge shape, covered in white hairs and can appear to have a blue tinge. The lips and nostrils should be black. Having black specks on the face and ears is not objectionable. The neck should be of medium length. The shoulders should be strong and level with the back, which should be flat.  The legs should be straight and wide apart and the hooves should be black.

The fleece should be dense (having thick and blocky clumps of wool also known as the staple). It should be lustrous, indicating the shine on the wool, and should have a well-defined crimp or wave from skin to tip. The common fibre diameter for an Leicester Longwool is 32 to 38 micrometres (microns).

The Leicester Longwool should be free, active and well balanced while in movement. It should appear to be alert and robust, showing style and character.

Other information
Leicester Longwool sheep are currently found in Australia, New Zealand, Great Britain, Sweden and the United States. They are sound-footed, which means they are acceptable on flat, hilly or more especially marginal country. 
They are large-framed with wide, even toplines (backs), strong constitutions and good temperaments.

See also
Border Leicester

References

External links

 Leicester Longwool Sheep Breeders Association (UK)
 Leicester Longwool Sheep Breeders Association (USA)
 English Leicester Association of Australia, Inc.
 Australian Stud Sheep Breeders Association (English Leicester section)
 New Zealand Sheep Breeders Association (English Leicester section)
 Animal Genetics Data Bank, Hannover Germany (Leicester Longwool section)

Sheep breeds
Sheep breeds originating in England
Animal breeds on the RBST Watchlist